Chebsey is a civil parish in the Borough of Stafford, Staffordshire, England. It contains 16 listed buildings that are recorded in the National Heritage List for England. Of these, one is listed at Grade I, the highest of the three grades, and the others are at Grade II, the lowest grade.  The parish contains villages, including Chebsey, Norton Bridge, and Shallowford, and the surrounding countryside.  Apart from a church with Norman origin, all the listed buildings are houses, cottages and farmhouses, the earliest of which are timber framed or have timber framed cores.


Key

Buildings

References

Citations

Sources

Lists of listed buildings in Staffordshire